Dhunda Fort  (transliteration: Dhundya Qilа̄)is located 106 km from Nashik, Nashik district, of Maharashtra.The Dhundya fort is located on a single hillock west of the road from Malegaon to Satana.

History
The fort was positioned to overlook the trade route from Khandesh to Nashik.

How to reach
The base village is easily accessible from Malegaon and  Satana.  It takes about 1 hour to see the fort.

Places to see
The fort is also called as Dundeshwar Mahraj hill. There is nothing structure left on the fort except few ruined buildings and few dried up water cisterns. There is a Bhameshwar temple at the base of the fort. The pathway from the back of the temple leads to the fort hill top. There are two water cisterns and Mahadev mandir at the top of the fort.

See also 
 List of forts in Maharashtra
 List of forts in India
 Marathi People

References 

Buildings and structures of the Maratha Empire
Forts in Nashik district
Tourist attractions in Nashik district
Former populated places in India

Forts in Maharashtra